The 1980 Swedish speedway season was the 1980 season of motorcycle speedway in Sweden.

Individual

Individual Championship
The 1980 Swedish Individual Speedway Championship final was held on 23 August in Eskilstuna. Jan Andersson won the Swedish Championship for the second time.

Junior Championship
 
Winner - Pierre Brannefors

Team

Team Championship
Njudungarna won division 1 and were declared the winners of the Swedish Speedway Team Championship for the second time. The team included Conny Samuelsson and Bo Wirebrand.

Piraterna and Kaparna won the second division north and south respectively, while Pilarna won the third division.

See also 
 Speedway in Sweden

References

Speedway leagues
Professional sports leagues in Sweden
Swedish
Seasons in Swedish speedway